Sea fog may refer to:
 A marine layer, an air mass that develops over the surface of a large body of water in the presence of a temperature inversion
 Sea Fog, a 2014 South Korean film
 Abyssal Spider, a 2020 Taiwanese film

See also
 Sea of fog